The National Record of Achievement was a folder given to secondary school pupils in the United Kingdom in the 1990s and early 2000s. It was a portfolio of documentation related to a pupil's academic and non-academic achievements, typically including GCSE certificates, certificates from extracurricular activities, school reports and anything else of relevance, presented in an official-looking folder.

Adopted by the Department for Education in 1991 and rolled out in 1993, the Record was intended to allow pupils to demonstrate skills and achievements beyond their exam results, potentially of use for further education and higher education admissions and to employers. It was hoped that pupils would continue to add to their Records after leaving school.

In practice, the National Record of Achievement failed to meet these aspirations. In the mid-1990s it was common to use them for further education admissions, for instance to sixth form college, but university admissions tutors never found them relevant. Neither further nor higher education institutions encouraged students to continue to update them. Only a small number of employers (typically those used to recruiting large numbers of school-leavers) made use of them alongside the traditional application form, and found them of limited use.

In 1996, a review of 16-19 qualifications by Ronald Dearing recommended the winding up of the National Record of Achievement scheme.

References

Student assessment and evaluation